Banas Kantha may refer to:

 Banaskantha district
Banas Kantha Agency